General elections were held in Azad Kashmir on 26 June 2011 to elect the members of ninth assembly of Azad Kashmir.

References

Elections in Azad Kashmir
Azad
2011 in Pakistani politics
June 2011 events in Pakistan